The Elephant Bar is a scratch-kitchen restaurant in the United States that specializes in globally-based dishes and traditional American fare. The corporate office is located in Las Vegas, Nevada. Their first restaurant opened in Lubbock, TX in 1980. In 2015, the chain comprised 25 restaurants throughout the United States, with the majority in California. Elephant Bar Restaurants are also located in New Mexico and Nevada. The restaurants are decorated around an African safari theme, with wildlife motifs. Many of the dishes offered are pan-Asian fusion in design.

In 2014, Elephant Bar filed for bankruptcy and closed 16 stores. In 2017, Elephant Bar closed a number of sites with no explanation. In March 2018,  Gen3 Hospitality purchased the Elephant Bar chain out of bankruptcy. By 2021, there was only 1 remaining location in Albuquerque, New Mexico.

References

External links 

 

Regional restaurant chains in the United States
1980 establishments in Texas

Fusion cuisine
Restaurants established in 1980
2017 mergers and acquisitions
Companies that filed for Chapter 11 bankruptcy in 2014
Companies that filed for Chapter 11 bankruptcy in 2017